is a 2015 Japanese superhero film, serving as the film adaptation of the 2014-2015 Kamen Rider Series television series Kamen Rider Drive. It was released on August 8, 2015, in a double billing with Shuriken Sentai Ninninger the Movie: The Dinosaur Lord's Splendid Ninja Scroll!. The film is written by television series screenwriter Riku Sanjo.

The film features the debut of the protagonist of Kamen Rider Ghost.

Story
A mysterious black car arrives through a wormhole revealing an enigmatic black Kamen Rider that resembles Drive as it dispatches three black shift cars throughout Downtown Tokyo. Two of the shift cars take on Roidmude forms as they hijacked a truck as the mysterious black car showed up with a police car and a monster-like construction vehicle driving from behind.

The next day, Shinosuke Tomari, Kiriko Shijima and Krim Steinbelt aka "Mr. Belt" are seen cruising in the Tridoron. Shinosuke takes out an envelope that is specifically given to him and Kiriko by Krim telling him not to open it until August 8. The trio respond to a police dispatch via radio communication as there is sightings of a Roidmude attack near downtown. As the opening title roles, Shinosuke quickly transform into Kamen Rider Drive and is fighting the Roidmude with Tridoron equipped with the Ride Boosters. He then transforms into Drive Type Formula and is about to finish off the Roidmude until he is interrupted by a mysterious young man dressed in white shouting out to him, "Dad don't fire!" Confused at hearing someone calling him "dad," Shinosuke tried to ignore the mysterious young man. When all of a sudden, Mr. Belt shouted out in a mysterious rage, "Shoot, SHOOT! Destroy everything!!" This triggered Drive into blasting a power plant causing collateral damage. Kiriko is then joined by her brother, Go Shijima as they try to figure out what is going on. Meanwhile, the Metropolitan Police declares Shinosuke Tomari as the culprit, and sentenced him to die. The young man stated that he is too late to change the past and so he and Shinosuke tried to run away knowing that they will be blamed for the incident. The two of them are attacked by the mysterious dark Rider, now revealed as Kamen Rider Dark Drive, who is targeting the young man but suddenly recognizes Drive as the father of Eiji Tomari. Shinosuke tries to fight off Dark Drive but is having difficulties in battling his evil counterpart because Mr. Belt stated that he can't control the Drive Driver's functions. The mysterious young man appears driving the Tridoron rescuing Shinosuke and evading the Dark Drive, alike a group of armed S.W.A.T. officers who tried to execute Shinosuke.

Eiji tries to fix the problem with Mr. Belt, only for being killed by Dark Drive. Later, Chase joins Shinosuke and Go for fighting the Future Roidmudes, one of them controlling an Astaco, which's destroyed by Chaser over the Booster Ride Crosser. Later, Drive and Mach proceed to fight against Dark Drive, defeating him. But later, Drive again gets out of control due to the problem with Mr. Belt, and almost kills Mach; but Shinosuke discards the belt, and punches him, getting free from its control, and later destroying it with the Shingou-Ax. At that moment, Eiji comes back again, but he reveals he's actually the Roidmude 108, who after killing Eiji, he took his form, stolen his Drive Driver, and went to the past for fusionating with his other self. He proceeds to transform into Dark Drive, and plans to kill Shinosuke, who's saved by Chase, who lends him his Mach Driver. Meanwhile, Kiriko tries to prove Shinosuke's innocence, but the councilman rejects to believing in them.

Later, that night, Shinosuke, hidden from Dark Drive and the police alike, proceeds to read the letter from Mr. Belt.

That day, Shinosuke arrives to the place said by Mr. Belt in the letter, and discovers his amazing collection of cars. At that moment, he finds himself with Kiriko, who's desperate for proving his innocence. At that moment, the place is attacked by Dark Drive, and both proceed to escape. Shinosuke rides the Proto-Tridoron, but its destroyed. Shinosuke tries to transform using Chaser's Signal Bike, but he can't, forcing him to using the Tridoron Key for transforming in Super Deadheat and fighting the Roidmudes, destroying one of them.

Meanwhile, Kiriko arrives at the Tokyo Metropolitan Police Department Headquarters with the evidences about the Roidmude 108, and everybody at the Unit proceed to help Drive, but at that moment, Shinji Koba tries to stop them, arguing that it couldn't contribute to their reputation. By this, enraged to the tears, Kiriko proceeds to confront Koba, telling him about Shinosuke's personality and duty as an officer. Later, a group of S.W.A.T. Officers come to saving Drive from a Roidmude, as a signal Koba changed of thoughts.

Drive proceeds to arrive the place where 108 tries to revive his past-self. Both transform and start to fight. Meanwhile, when a Roidmude started an attack, Kamen Rider Ghost appeared to destroy it, before the astonishment of Kiriko and Genpachiro.

Drive is defeated by Dark Drive. When he was almost near of killing Shinosuke, the present-108 appeared. Both iterations of Roidmudes fuse into a single Roidmude known as Paradox, who starts a new Global Freeze, and proceeds to kill Shinosuke. But Shinosuke is saved by Go, who fights against Paradox. Later, at that moment, Shinosuke remembers about the Tridoron Key, and gets an idea; so, he recovers the Future Drive Driver, and, alongside the Tridoron Key, he gets success in reviving Mr. Belt, who actually had this plan on mind. Later, Shinosuke proceeds to transforming in Drive, for fighting Paradox, but he gets the effect of the Heavy Acceleration. But, at that moment, Kiriko throws him Eiji's Shift Car, saving Shinosuke, and he proceeds to transformating in Drive Type Special. He fights Paradox again, and after attacking him, he destroys him with a Rider Kick.

Later, with Mr. Belt back again, and himself being exonerated, Shinosuke is talking with Kiriko about what happened. At that moment, Shinosuke remembers a thing said by 108 disguised as Eiji about his mother, making Shinosuke realizing his mother was actually Kiriko, which Shinosuke thinks it's a joke.

Production and casting
Mercedes Benz partnered up with the film to create a special Mercedes-AMG GT to serve as Kamen Rider Dark Drive's NexTridoron car.

Mackenyu, son of Sonny Chiba, portrays Eiji Tomari, the son of Shinosuke Tomari (Ryoma Takeuchi). Although he grew up in the United States, he did watch Kamen Rider as a child, and is excited to be a part of the movie. His uncle, Jiro Chiba, previously portrayed Kazuya Taki during the original Kamen Rider.

Cast
: 
: 
: 
: 
: 
: 
: 
: 
: 
Truckers: , 
Miku's manager: 
: 
: 
: 
: 
: 
: 
:

Theme song
"re-ray"
Lyrics & Composition: Mitsuru Matsuoka
Arrangement: tatsuo (of everset), Shuhei Naruse
Artist: Mitsuru Matsuoka EARNEST DRIVE
The song's title is short for "Reflective Ray".

1 Minute Stories
 is a set of short movies to promote the movie that aired following episodes 38-41 of the series. It comprises four episodes and features Eiji Tomari.

Reception

Kamen Rider Drive: Surprise Future grossed $7,118,376 at the box office.

References

External links

2010s Kamen Rider films
Surprise Future
2015 films
Films directed by Takayuki Shibasaki
Films about police officers
Films about totalitarianism